Villa Gordiani is a park along the Via Prenestina, in Rome, Italy. It is home to several ancient Roman remains, traditionally  identified with the villa of the Gordian imperial family, which included three Roman emperors of the 3rd century, Gordian I, Gordian II and Gordian III.

History
The complex, which is mentioned in ancient sources such as the Historia Augusta, had a portico with some 200 columns, in different stones. It also included basilicas and baths.

During the 13th century, the Tor de' Schiavi (literally "Tower of the Slaves", although the name derives from the dello Schiavo family, who acquired it in 1571) was built over the remains. In 1422 the area was acquired by the Colonna family. The monumental entrance of the villa is an octagonal structure dating perhaps to the late 3rd-early 4th century, when the villa was enlarged and restored.

The complex and the garden were restored in the 1960s, and has now the status of an archaeological park. It is divided in two sectors by the Via Prenestina.

Gallery

See also
Roman gardens
Ancient Roman architecture index
History of Roman and Byzantine domes

Sources

External links

Parks in Rome
Ancient Roman buildings and structures in Rome
Go
Rome Q. VII Prenestino-Labicano
Rome Q. XXII Collatino